Parliamentary elections were held in Portugal on 16 November 1913. These were the first elections under the new Constitution, approved in 1911, that created a Bicameralism legislature. The result was a victory for the Democratic Party, which won 68 of the 153 seats in the Chamber of Deputies and 24 of the 66 seats in the Senate.

Results

Notes

References

External links
Eleições Portuguesas de 1913

Legislative elections in Portugal
Portugal
1913 elections in Portugal
November 1913 events